Qaarsut (old spelling: Kaersut) is a settlement in Avannaata municipality, in northwestern Greenland. It is situated on the northeastern shore of the Nuussuaq Peninsula. It had 174 inhabitants in 2020.

History 
The first coal mine in Greenland operated between 1778 and 1924 in Qaarsuarsuit.

Transport 

Qaarsut Airport, located to the northwest of the settlement, serves both Qaarsut and Uummannaq, the latter accessible only by helicopter.

Population 
The population of Qaarsut has dropped by over 18 percent relative to the 2000 levels, reflecting a general trend in the region.

Gallery

References 

Populated places in Greenland
Populated places of Arctic Greenland
Avannaata
Uummannaq Fjord